The flag of the German State of North Rhine-Westphalia is a horizontal tricolor consisting of green, white and red.

Overview
After the establishment of North Rhine-Westphalia in 1946, the tricolor was first introduced in 1948, but was not formally adopted until 1953. The plain variant of the tricolor is considered the civil flag and state ensign, while government authorities use the state flag (Landesdienstflagge) which is defaced with the state's coat of arms.

The flag is a combination of the two former provinces of Prussia that comprise most of the state: the Rhine Province and Westphalia. The state ensign can easily be mistaken for the flag of Hungary, as well as the former civil flag of Iran (Persia) (1910-1980) and the flag of the Parti patriote.
The same flag was used by the Rhenish Republic (1923-1924) as a symbol of independence and freedom.

History

See also 

 Flags of German states

References

External links
 

North Rhine-Westphalia
North Rhine-Westphalia
Flag